beIN Sports USA is a pay television sports network which primarily airs top level soccer, featuring exclusive coverage of Ligue 1, along with content from other leagues in Europe. In addition, BeIN Sports airs matches from such sports as rugby, auto racing, handball, motorcycle racing, tennis, and volleyball. A companion network, BeIN Sports USA Español, carries simulcasts or a different schedule of events primarily in Spanish, with both networks offering secondary Spanish or English commentary via the second audio program option. It is a subsidiary of the Qatari Media Network beIN.

History
BeIN Sports USA launched on the satellite provider DirecTV on August 16, 2012, coinciding with the start of the European soccer leagues 2012–13 season. beIN launched on the satellite Dish network the following day before being added to cable giant Comcast on September 6, 2012. Verizon FiOS added BeIN Sports in March 2013.

In 2016, BeIN Sports reached a deal with Conference USA to carry select football, basketball, baseball, and softball games, This agreement ended after the 2018-19 season and was not renewed. Also in 2016, BeIN Sports began showing matches from the North American Soccer League.

In August 2018, several major television providers dropped the network, including AT&T (both DirecTV and U-verse), Verizon Fios, and Xfinity.

In October 2018, the WTA Tour returned its broadcast rights back to Tennis Channel. Its contract with BeIN (as part of a wider international deal) was criticized by fans for limiting the reach of its events, citing inconsistent and intermittent scheduling due to conflicts with international soccer, and decreasing carriage.

In 2019, BeIN Sports launched BeIN Sports Xtra, a 24/7 live stream extension of the BeIN Sports brand that allows fans to view select games for free and airs other sports related programs, such as highlights; it also has a complementary service in Spanish, BeIN Sports Xtra ñ. The service is available on FuboTV, Sling TV, Pluto TV, The Roku Channel, Vizio, Redbox, Samsung TV Plus, Fanatiz, Klowd TV, Xumo, and is available through over-the-air television stations in select markets.

Based on numbers from Nielsen, Variety ranked beIN Sports as the lowest-rated broadcast or cable network in the United States in 2021 based on total viewers, with a 40% decline year-over-year.

Programming

Current

European soccer
 France: Ligue 1, Ligue 2, Trophée des Champions
 Turkey: Süper Lig

South American soccer
 Copa Libertadores
 Copa Sudamericana
 Recopa Sudamericana
 Brasil Global Tour

Other soccer
 Africa Cup of Nations
 Women's Africa Cup of Nations
 National Independent Soccer Association
 CAF Champions League
 CAF Confederation Cup

Handball 

 EHF Champions League

Professional wrestling
Major League Wrestling
MLW Fusion
Battle Riot III

Motorsports 
FIM Speedway Grand Prix 
World Touring Car Cup

Former

European soccer 

 Spain: Copa del Rey (exclude final) (until 2018–19)
 France: Coupe de la Ligue (until 2019–20)
Sweden: Swedish Cup (semifinals and final)
Spain: La Liga  2012-2021
Italy: Serie A 2012-2017
England: EFL Cup 2012-2015
 Austria: ÖFB Cup (final only)
 France: Coupe de France (through 2022)

Basketball

 Europe: Basketball Champions League

Motorsports 

 MotoAmerica (2016, 2017, and 2018)
 FIA World Rallycross Championship (WRX)
SBK Superbike 2012-2018
 W Series

Tennis

 ATP World Tour 250

Gaelic games

 Gaelic Athletic Association

Commentators

Play-by-Play
 Phil Schoen (Lead English)
 George D. Metellus (#2 English)
 Antonio Aquilino (#3 English)
 Alejandro Figueredo (Lead Spanish)
 Oscar Salazár (#2 Spanish)
 Juan Fernando Mora (#3 Spanish)
 Pablo Mariño (#4 Spanish)

Color Commentators
 Thomas Rongen (Lead English)
 Juan Fernando Mora (Lead Spanish)

List of BeIN Sports Xtra affiliates

References

Sports television networks in the United States
Television channels and stations established in 2012
BeIN Sports